State Route 99 (SR 99) is a primary state highway in the U.S. state of Virginia.  The state highway runs  from the north town limit of Pulaski east to SR F-047 just east of Interstate 81 (I-81) and SR 100 at McAdam.

Route description

SR 99 begins at the north town limit of Pulaski.  The highway continues north into unincorporated Pulaski County as SR 738 (Robinson Tract Road).  SR 99 heads south as two-lane undivided Randolph Avenue.  At the west edge of downtown, SR 99 splits into a one-way pair.  Westbound SR 99 turns onto Randolph Avenue from 3rd Street while eastbound SR 99 turns from Randolph Avenue onto Main Street, which parallels Peak Creek through downtown.  Each direction of SR 99 follows two-way streets east to Jefferson Avenue, where both Main and 3rd become one-way.  One block to the east, SR 99 intersects U.S. Route 11 (Washington Avenue).  Two blocks east of US 11, Main Street becomes a four-lane divided highway as the two directions of the state highway come together.  SR 99 gains a median west of Bob White Boulevard, where the highway reduces to two lanes, begins to curve to the south, and crosses Norfolk Southern Railway's Pulaski District and Peak Creek.  At the east town limit of Pulaski, the state highway becomes Count Pulaski Drive, which expands to a four-lane divided highway shortly before reaching its partial cloverleaf interchange with I-81 and SR 100 and, just to the south, its eastern terminus at SR F-047 (Kirby Road) in the hamlet of McAdam.

History
SR 99 east of downtown Pulaski was initially part of State Route 10, supplemented with U.S. Route 11 in 1926. In the early 1930s, US 11 was rerouted along its current route south of Pulaski, but SR 10 remained. The road from Pulaski northwest for 6.20 miles (9.98 km) was added to the state highway system in 1932 as State Route 228. In the 1933 renumbering, SR 228, as well as SR 212 north of McAdam, became State Route 99. (The rest of SR 212 became State Route 100.) The rest of the road to the Bland County line was added in 1936, and in 1937 it was completed to SR 42 at Mechanicsburg. In 1952, the state decided to transfer the whole road northwest of Pulaski to the secondary system "when present primary funds set up for its improvement are expended"; the former SR 99 became State Route 738 then.

Major intersections

References

External links

Virginia Highways Project: VA 99

099
State Route 099